Automatic taxonomy construction (ATC) is the use of software programs to generate taxonomical classifications from a body of texts called a corpus. ATC is a branch of natural language processing, which in turn is a branch of artificial intelligence.

A taxonomy (or taxonomical classification) is a scheme of classification, especially, a hierarchical classification, in which things are organized into groups or types. Among other things, a taxonomy can be used to organize and index knowledge (stored as documents, articles, videos, etc.), such as in the form of a library classification system, or a search engine taxonomy, so that users can more easily find the information they are searching for. Many taxonomies are hierarchies (and thus, have an intrinsic tree structure), but not all are.

Manually developing and maintaining a taxonomy is a labor-intensive task requiring significant time and resources, including familiarity of or expertise in the taxonomy's domain (scope, subject, or field), which drives the costs and limits the scope of such projects. Also, domain modelers have their own points of view which inevitably, even if unintentionally, work their way into the taxonomy. ATC uses artificial intelligence techniques to quickly automatically generate a taxonomy for a domain in order to avoid these problems and remove limitations.

Approaches 

There are several approaches to ATC. One approach is to use rules to detect patterns in the corpus and use those patterns to infer relations such as hyponymy. Other approaches use machine learning techniques such as Bayesian inferencing and Artificial Neural Networks.

Keyword extraction 

One approach to building a taxonomy is to automatically gather the keywords from a domain using keyword extraction, then analyze the relationships between them (see Hyponymy, below), and then arrange them as a taxonomy based on those relationships.

Hyponymy and "is-a" relations 

In ATC programs, one of the most important tasks is the discovery of hypernym and hyponym relations among words. One way to do that from a body of text is to search for certain phrases like "is a" and "such as".

In linguistics, is-a relations are called hyponymy. Words that describe categories are called hypernyms and words that are examples of categories are hyponyms. For example, dog is a hypernym and Fido is one of its hyponyms. A word can be both a hyponym and a hypernym. So, dog is a hyponym of mammal and also a hypernym of Fido.

Taxonomies are often represented as is-a hierarchies where each level is more specific than (in mathematical language "a subset of") the level above it. For example, a basic biology taxonomy would have concepts such as mammal, which is a subset of animal, and dogs and cats, which are subsets of mammal. This kind of taxonomy is called an is-a model because the specific objects are considered instances of a concept. For example, Fido is-a instance of the concept dog and Fluffy is-a cat.

Applications 

ATC can be used to build  taxonomies for search engines, to improve search results.

ATC systems are a key component of ontology learning (also known as automatic ontology construction), and have been used to automatically generate large ontologies for domains such as insurance and finance. They have also been used to enhance existing large networks such as Wordnet to make them more complete and consistent.

ATC software

Other names 

Other names for automatic taxonomy construction include:
 Automated outline building
 Automated outline construction
 Automated outline creation
 Automated outline extraction
 Automated outline generation
 Automated outline induction
 Automated outline learning
 Automated outlining
 Automated taxonomy building
 Automated taxonomy construction
 Automated taxonomy creation
 Automated taxonomy extraction
 Automated taxonomy generation
 Automated taxonomy induction
 Automated taxonomy learning
 Automatic outline building
 Automatic outline construction
 Automatic outline creation
 Automatic outline extraction
 Automatic outline generation
 Automatic outline induction
 Automatic outline learning
 Automatic taxonomy building
 Automatic taxonomy creation
 Automatic taxonomy extraction
 Automatic taxonomy generation
 Automatic taxonomy induction
 Automatic taxonomy learning
 Outline automation
 Outline building
 Outline construction
 Outline creation
 Outline extraction
 Outline generation
 Outline induction
 Outline learning
 Semantic taxonomy building
 Semantic taxonomy construction
 Semantic taxonomy creation
 Semantic taxonomy extraction
 Semantic taxonomy generation
 Semantic taxonomy induction
 Semantic taxonomy learning
 Taxonomy automation
 Taxonomy building
 Taxonomy construction
 Taxonomy creation
 Taxonomy extraction
 Taxonomy generation
 Taxonomy induction
 Taxonomy learning

See also 

 Document classification
 Information extraction

References

Further reading 

 Automatic Taxonomy Construction from Keywords (2012)
 Domain taxonomy learning from text: The subsumption method versus hierarchical clustering from Data & Knowledge Engineering, Volume 83, January 2013, Pages 54–69
 Learning taxonomic relations from a set of text documents
 Learning Taxonomic Relations from Heterogeneous Sources of Evidence
 A Metric-based Framework for Automatic Taxonomy Induction
 A New Method for Evaluating Automatically Learned Terminological Taxonomies
 Problematizing and Addressing the Article-as-Concept Assumption in Wikipedia 
 Structured Learning for Taxonomy Induction with Belief Propagation
 Taxonomy Learning Using Word Sense Induction

External links 
 Taxonomy 101: The Basics and Getting Started with Taxonomies – shows where ATC fits in to the general activity of managing taxonomies for a business enterprise in need of knowledge management.

Natural language processing
Taxonomy